"Woman's Work" is a song written by Canadian singer-songwriter Sheree Jeacocke with Lou Pomanti and Bonnie J. Cooke. It was originally recorded by Jeacocke and released as a single in 1989, and was featured in the 1990 Japanese film Best Guy. The song was covered by Australian pop singer Tina Arena on her 1990 album Strong as Steel and released as the album's fourth and final single in 1991. The single failed to chart in Australia.

The song was also covered by Canadian country music artist Tracey Brown on her 1998 debut solo album of the same name and released as the album's first single. Brown's version peaked at number 12 on the RPM Country Tracks chart in September 1998.

Track listing

Tina Arena
"Woman's Work" was released as a 7" single.

"Woman's Work" (single edit) – 3:40
"I Believe" – 5:47

Chart performance

Tracey Brown

Year-end charts

References

1989 singles
1991 singles
Sheree Jeacocke songs
Tina Arena songs
Tracey Brown songs
1998 debut singles
EMI Records singles
1989 songs
Australian synth-pop songs